Citatuzumab bogatox (VB6-845) is a monoclonal antibody Fab fragment fused with bouganin, a ribosome inactivating protein from the plant Bougainvillea spectabilis. It has undergone preclinical development for the treatment of ovarian cancer and other solid tumors.

References 

Antibody-drug conjugates
Monoclonal antibodies for tumors